Protein NDRG1 is a protein that in humans is encoded by the NDRG1 gene.

This gene is a member of the N-myc downregulated gene family which belongs to the alpha/beta hydrolase superfamily. The protein encoded by this gene is a cytoplasmic protein involved in stress responses, hormone responses, cell growth, and differentiation . Mutations in this gene have been reported to be causative the autosomal-recessive version of Charcot-Marie-Tooth disease known as CMT4D.

It has been reported that NDRG1 localizes to the endosomes and is a Rab4a effector involved in vesicular recycling.

As reviewed by Fang et al., NDRG1 is involved in embryogenesis and development, cell growth and differentiation, lipid biosynthesis and myelination, stress responses, immunity, DNA repair and cell adhesion among other functions.  NDRG1 is localised in the cytoplasm, nucleus and mitochondrion, at probabilities of 47.8%, 26.1% and 8.7%, respectively.  In response to DNA damage  NDRG1 translocates from the cytoplasm to the nucleus, where it may inhibit cell growth and promote DNA repair mechanisms.  It is suggested that NDRG1 acts as a stress response gene or potentially as a transcription factor.

Gene 
In humans, NDRG1 gene is located on the long arm of chromosome 8 (8q24.22). The gene encodes a 3.0 kilobases (kb) messenger RNA (mRNA) composed of 394 amino acids. NDRG1 belong to the NDRG1 family consisting of four members - NDRG1, NDRG2, NDRG3 and NDRG4 - that share a 53-65 % homology. In contrast to other family members, NDRG1 has a three tandem (GTRSRSHTSE) repeats in the C-terminal part.

The expression of NDRG1 is regulated by hypoxia dependent and independent manner. Under hypoxia the oxygen sensor hypoxia-inducible factor (HIF)-1α is translocated from cytoplasma to nucleus, where binds to HIF-1β to form HIF-1 complex. This complex works as a transcription factor, binds to hypoxia response element (HRE) in the promoter of hypoxia-related genes, one of these genes is the NDRG1. Also heavy metal ions (nickel, cobalt, iron) upregulate NDRG1 by mimicking hypoxia. Opposite effect on NDRG1 expression could have myc oncoproteins, N-myc and c-myc, which transcriptionally repress the expression. These effect is mediated indirectly by decreasing its promoter activity.

Role in cancer 

As reviewed by Kovacevic et al., NDRG1 is a potent, iron-regulated growth and metastasis suppressor that was found to be negatively correlated with cancer progression in a number of tumors, including prostate, pancreatic, breast, and colon cancers.  NDRG1 has marked anti-oncogenic activity, being associated with decreased cell proliferation, migration, invasion, and angiogenesis.  The molecular functions of NDRG1 affect numerous signaling pathways that regulate cancer cell proliferation, invasion, angiogenesis, and migration.  Specifically, NDRG1 inhibits the oncogenic RAS, c-Src, phosphatidylinositol 3-kinase (PI3K), WNT, ROCK1/pMLC2, and nuclear factor-light chain enhancer of activated B cell (NF-B) pathways, while promoting expression of key tumor-suppressive molecules including phosphatase and tensin homolog, E-cadherin, and mothers against decapentaplegic homolog 4 (SMAD4).  Through its effects on E-cadherin and beta-catenin, which form the adherens junction and promote cell adhesion, NDRG1 also inhibits the epithelial to mesenchymal transition, an initial key step in metastasis.

Functions in DNA repair and aging

In one of its functions at a molecular level, NDRG1 binds and stabilizes methyltransferases, chiefly O-6-methylguanine-DNA methyltransferase (MGMT), a DNA repair protein.  Thus, higher expression of NDRG1 can promote MGMT protein stability and activity.  Dominick et al. showed NDRG1 and MGMT protein expression was increased by 2-fold to 3-fold for each of three strains of mice (Snell, GHKRO, and PAPPA-KO) with increased longevity.  These authors strongly suggest a link between the increase in the MGMT DNA repair pathway and a delay in the aging process in these mouse strains.  This is consistent with the DNA damage theory of aging.

Role in immune system 
The NDRG1 plays an important role in allergy and anaphylaxis, defence against bacterial pathogens and bacterial clearance, inflammation and wound healing. In mast cells, NDRG1 is upregulated during maturation and helps to rapid degranulation, which leads to enhanced exocytosis in response to various stimuli. Also was shown its role in T-cell clonal anergy downstream of Egr2, where NDRG1 is upregulated in the absence of costimulation to inhibit subsequent re-activation of T cells by TCR and CD28 signalling.

References

Further reading

External links 
  GeneReviews/NCBI/NIH/UW entry on Charcot-Marie-Tooth Neuropathy Type 4

Human proteins